Chiloglanis benuensis is a species of upside-down catfish native to Cameroon and Nigeria where it occurs in the Niger, Bénoué and Chad River systems.  This species grows to a length of  TL.

References

External links 

benuensis
Freshwater fish of West Africa
Fish of Cameroon
Fish described in 1963